Taylor Louise West (born December 13, 1993) is a women's field hockey player from the United States. West was raised to the United States national team in 2016, from the development squad.

West's most notable performance with the team was at the 2016-17 Hockey World League Semifinals in Johannesburg, South Africa. West scored an equalising goal against Germany with two minutes remaining in the final, sending the game to a penalty shoot-out which the United States eventually won.

West was also a member of the national team at the 2017 Pan American Cup where the team won a bronze medal.

References

1993 births
Living people
American female field hockey players
People from Princess Anne, Maryland
Sportspeople from Maryland
21st-century American women